Paranthaclisis congener is a species of antlion in the family Myrmeleontidae. It is found in Central America and North America.

References

Further reading

 

Acanthaclisini
Articles created by Qbugbot
Insects described in 1861
Insects of Central America
Insects of North America